Bhatamaas is a Nepali name for fried black soybeans.

See also
 List of Nepalese dishes

References

External links
 Photo of Bhadmaas

Nepalese cuisine
Legume dishes